The 2015 Phoenix mayoral election took place on August 25, 2015, to elect the Mayor of Phoenix, Arizona. This was also the day of elections for Council Members in Districts 1, 3, 5, and 7.

The election is officially nonpartisan. Had no candidate won  a majority of the vote, a runoff would have been held on November 3 between the top two finishers.

Incumbent mayor Greg Stanton ran for re-election to a second term in office and won re-election.

Candidates

Declared
 Anna Maria Brennan, businesswoman and candidate for Mayor in 2011
 Matt Jette, teacher, Republican candidate for Governor in 2010, and Democratic nominee for Arizona's 6th congressional district in 2012
 Greg Stanton, incumbent Mayor

Declined
 Sal DiCiccio, District 6 City Councilman
 Phil Gordon, former Mayor
 Christine Jones, former Go Daddy executive and Republican candidate for Governor in 2014

Polling

References

External links 
 City of Phoenix Official Website – Election results
 Maricopa County Republican Committee: Overview of Republican races.
 Maricopa County Republican Committee: Ongoing news articles.

2015 Arizona elections
Mayoral elections in Phoenix, Arizona
2015 United States mayoral elections